John T. Rice was a member of the Wisconsin State Assembly.

Biography
Rice was born on May 24, 1839 in Waterford (town), Wisconsin. During the American Civil War, he served with the 15th Wisconsin Volunteer Regiment of the Union Army, achieving the rank of captain. Events he took part in the Battle of Island Number Ten, the Battle of Perryville, the Battle of Stones River, the Battle of Chickamauga and the Atlanta Campaign. Rice died on April 8, 1925 in Milwaukee, Wisconsin.

Political career
Rice was a member of the Assembly in 1877. Additionally, he was Chairman (similar to Mayor) of Waterford and Chairman of the Racine County, Wisconsin Board of Supervisors. He was a Republican.

References

Republican Party members of the Wisconsin State Assembly
Mayors of places in Wisconsin
County supervisors in Wisconsin
People of Wisconsin in the American Civil War
Union Army officers
1839 births
1925 deaths